Yara Silva commonly known as just Yara (born 13 February 1964) is a Brazilian footballer who played as a defender for the Brazil women's national football team. She was part of the team at the 1995 FIFA Women's World Cup. At the club level, she played for E.C. GAMA.

References

External links
 

1964 births
Living people
Brazilian women's footballers
Brazil women's international footballers
Place of birth missing (living people)
1995 FIFA Women's World Cup players
Women's association football defenders